Smolensk is a city and the administrative center of Smolensk Oblast, Russia, located on the Dnieper River,  west-southwest of Moscow. First mentioned in 863, it is one of the oldest cities in Russia.

The city has been destroyed several times throughout its long history because it was on the invasion routes of various empires. Smolensk is known for its electronics, textiles, food processing, and diamond faceting industries.

Etymology
The name of the city is derived from the name of the Smolnya River. Smolnya river flows through Karelian and Murmansk areas of north-western Russia. The origin of the river's name is less clear. One possibility is the old Slavic word  for black soil, which might have colored the waters of the Smolnya. An alternative origin could be the Russian word , which means resin, tar, or pitch. Pine trees grow in the area, and the city was once a center of resin processing and trade.

Geography
The city is located in European Russia on the banks of the upper Dnieper River, which crosses the city within the Smolensk Upland, which is the western part of the Smolensk–Moscow Upland. The Dnieper River flows through the city from east to west and divides it into two parts: the northern (Zadneprove) and southern (center). Within the city and its surroundings the river takes in several small tributaries.

In the valleys are stretched streets, high ridges, hills, and headlands form the mountain. Smolensk is situated on seven hills (mountains). The old part of the city occupies the high, rugged left (south) bank of the Dnieper River. The area features undulating terrain, with a large number of tributaries, creeks and ravines.

History

Medieval origins

Smolensk is among the oldest Russian cities of the known Rus' era. The first recorded mention of the city was 863 AD, two years after the founding of Kievan Rus'. According to Russian Primary Chronicle, Smolensk (probably located slightly downstream, at the archaeological site of Gnezdovo) was located on the area settled by the East Slavic Radimichs tribe in 882 when Oleg of Novgorod took it in passing from Novgorod to Kiev. The town was first attested two decades earlier, when the Varangian chieftains Askold and Dir, while on their way to Kiev, decided against challenging Smolensk on account of its large size and population.

The first foreign writer to mention the city was the Byzantine Emperor Constantine Porphyrogenitus. In De Administrando Imperio (c. 950) he described Smolensk as a key station on the trade route from the Varangians to the Greeks. The Rus' people sailed from the Baltic region up the Western Dvina (Daugava) River as far as they could then they portaged their boats to the upper Dnieper. It was in Smolensk that they supposedly mended any leaks and small holes that might have appeared in their boats from being dragged on the ground and they used tar to do that, hence the city name.

The Principality of Smolensk was founded in 1054. Due to its central position in Kievan Rus', the city developed rapidly. By the end of the 12th century, the princedom was one of the strongest in Eastern Europe, so that Smolensk princes frequently controlled the Kievan throne. Numerous churches were built in the city at that time, including the church of Sts. Peter and Paul (1146, reconstructed to its presumed original appearance after World War II) and the church of St. John the Baptist (1180, also partly rebuilt). The most remarkable church in the city is called Svirskaya (1197, still standing); it was admired by contemporaries as the most beautiful structure east of Kiev.

Smolensk had its own veche since the very beginning of its history. Its power increased after the disintegration of Kievan Rus', and although it was not as strong as the veche in Novgorod, the princes had to take its opinion into consideration; several times in 12th and 13th centuries there was an open conflict between them.

Between Lithuania and Russia

Although spared by the Mongol armies in 1240, Smolensk paid tribute to the Golden Horde, gradually becoming a pawn in the long struggle between Grand Duchy of Lithuania and the Grand Duchy of Moscow. The last sovereign monarch of Smolensk was Yury of Smolensk; during his reign the city was taken by Vytautas the Great of Lithuania on three occasions: in 1395, 1404, and 1408. After the city's incorporation into the Grand Duchy of Lithuania, some of Smolensk's boyars (e.g., the Sapiehas) moved to Vilnius; descendants of the ruling princes (e.g., the Tatishchevs, Kropotkins, Mussorgskys, Vyazemskys) fled to Moscow.

Three Lithuanian Smolensk regiments took part in the 1410 Battle of Grunwald (Tannenberg) against the Teutonic Knights. It was a severe blow to Lithuania when the city was taken by Vasily III of Russia in 1514. To commemorate this event, the Tsar founded the Novodevichy Convent in Moscow and dedicated it to the icon of Our Lady of Smolensk.

In order to repel future Polish–Lithuanian attacks, Boris Godunov made it his priority to heavily fortify the city. The stone kremlin constructed in 1597–1602 is the largest in Russia. It features thick walls and numerous watchtowers. Heavy fortifications did not prevent the fortress from being taken by the Polish–Lithuanian Commonwealth in 1611 after a long twenty-month siege, during the Time of Troubles and Dimitriads. Weakened Muscovy temporarily ceded Smolensk land to the Polish–Lithuanian Commonwealth in the Truce of Deulino. The city was granted Magdeburg rights in 1611 and was the seat of Smolensk Voivodeship for the next forty-three years.

To recapture the city, the Tsardom of Russia launched the so-called "Smolensk War" against the Commonwealth in 1632. After a defeat at the hands of king Wladislaw IV, the city remained in Polish–Lithuanian hands. In 1632, the Uniate bishop Lew Kreuza built his apartments in Smolensk; they were later converted into the Eastern Orthodox Church of Saint Barbara. The hostilities resumed in 1654 when the Commonwealth was being affected by the Khmelnytsky Uprising and the Swedish deluge. After another siege, on September 23, 1654, Smolensk was recaptured by Russia. In the 1667 Truce of Andrusovo, the Polish–Lithuanian Commonwealth renounced its claims to Smolensk.

Modern history

Smolensk has been a special place to Russians for many reasons, not least for the fact that the local cathedral housed one of the most venerated Orthodox icons, attributed to St. Luke. Building the new Cathedral of the Assumption was a great project which took more than a century to complete. Despite slowly sinking into an economic backwater, Smolensk was still valued by the Tsars as a key fortress defending the route to Moscow. It was made the seat of Smolensk Governorate in 1708.

In August 1812, two of the largest armies ever assembled clashed in Smolensk. During the hard-fought battle, described by Leo Tolstoy in War and Peace (Book Three Part Two Chapter 4), Napoleon entered the city. Total losses were estimated at 30,000 men. Apart from other military monuments, central Smolensk features the Eagles monument, unveiled in 1912 to mark the centenary of Napoleon's Russian campaign.

At the beginning of World War I, the 56th Smolensk Infantry Division was first assigned to the First Army of the Imperial Russian Army. They fought at the Battle of Tannenberg. It was subsequently transferred to the 10th Army and fought at the Second Battle of the Masurian Lakes. In March 1918, the Belarusian People's Republic, proclaimed in Minsk under the German occupation, declared Smolensk part of it. In February–December 1918, Smolensk was home to the headquarters of the Western Front, North-West Oblast Bolshevik Committee and Western Oblast Executive Committee. On January 1, 1919, the Byelorussian Soviet Socialist Republic was proclaimed in Smolensk, but its government moved to Minsk as soon as the German forces had been driven out of the city several days later.

Soviet period
After the revolution, there was debate on whether to include Smolensk in the Byelorussian SSR. In 1920 a provincial census was held, according to which the Russian population prevailed over the Belarusian one, meaning Smolensk had to be transferred to the Russian SFSR. The Polish section of the city resisted this decision, and in April 1935 the Mieczysław rebellion was held, in which an estimated 176 Polish resistance fighters perished, in contrast to 7 wounded Russian soldiers dispatched to control the rioting.
In 1940,  from Smolensk, the Katyn Massacre occurred, in which some 22,000 Polish POWs were murdered by the NKVD. At this time Boris Menshagin was mayor of Smolensk, with his deputy Boris Bazilevsky. Both of them would be key witnesses in the Nuremberg Trials over the massacre.

During World War II, Smolensk once again saw wide-scale fighting during the first Battle of Smolensk when the city was captured by the Germans on July 16, 1941. The first Soviet counteroffensive against the German army was launched in August but failed. However, the limited Soviet victories outside the city halted the German advance for a crucial two months, granting time to Moscow's defenders to prepare in earnest. Over 93% of the city was destroyed during the fighting; the ancient icon of Our Lady of Smolensk was lost. Nevertheless, it escaped total destruction. In late 1943, Hermann Göring had ordered Gotthard Heinrici to destroy Smolensk in accordance with the Nazi "scorched earth" policy. He refused and was punished for it. The city was finally liberated on September 25, 1943, during the second Battle of Smolensk. The rare title of Hero City was bestowed on Smolensk after the war.

After the Germans captured the city in 1941, they found the intact archives of the Smolensk Oblast Committee of the Communist Party, the so-called Smolensk Archive. The archive was moved to Germany, and a significant part of it eventually ended up in the United States, providing Western scholars and intelligence specialists with unique information during the Cold War on the local workings of the Soviet government during its first two decades. The archives were returned to Russia by the United States in 2002.

Recent events
On April 10, 2010, a Tu-154 military jet carrying Polish president Lech Kaczyński, his wife, and many notable political and military figures crashed in a wooded area near Smolensk while approaching the local military airport. All ninety-six passengers died immediately on impact. The purpose of the visit was to commemorate the 70th anniversary of the Katyn massacre.

In June 2013, archaeologists of the Russian Academy of Sciences discovered and unearthed ancient temples in Smolensk dated to the middle to second half of the 12th century, built on the left bank of the Dnieper River. At the time the city was the capital of Smolensk principality.

In September 2013, Smolensk widely celebrated its 1,150th anniversary with funds spent on different construction and renovation projects in the city. In celebration the Central Bank of Russia issued commemorative coins made of precious metals.

Attractions
Owing to its long and rich history, Smolensk is home to many examples of Russian architecture ranging from the Kievan Rus period to post-WWII Stalinist style. Although the city was destroyed several times over, many historically and culturally significant buildings remain, including a large number of churches and cathedrals. The most famous of these are the Cathedral of the Assumption, the Immaculate Conception Church, and the Church of St. Michael the Archangel, which is one of the few structures from before the Mongol invasion remaining in Russia.

The Smolensk Kremlin
The Smolensk Kremlin, built at the end of the 16th century during the reign of Tsars Fyodor I Ioannovich and Boris Godunov, under the supervision of the architect Fyodor Kon,  is one of the greatest achievement of Russian medieval architecture and military engineering.

Churches and cathedrals

Monuments
Being the site of many great battles in Russian history, Smolensk is home to many monuments commemorating its rich military history.

Lopatinsky garden

Square of Memory of Heroes

Education buildings

Post-war Stalinist buildings

Administrative and municipal status
Smolensk serves as the administrative center of the oblast and, within the framework of administrative divisions, it also serves as the administrative center of Smolensky District, even though it is not a part of it. As an administrative division, it is incorporated separately as Smolensk Urban Okrug—an administrative unit with the status equal to that of the districts. As a municipal division, this administrative unit also has urban okrug status.

Climate
Smolensk has a warm-summer humid continental climate (Köppen climate classification Dfb). By European standards, the climate is quite cold for its latitude on 54°N. The far inland position warms springs up relatively quickly, with May being quite a bit milder than September.

Economy
Smolensk has several factories including the Smolensk Aviation Plant and several electronics and agricultural machinery factories.

Transportation

Smolensk is located on the M1 main highway and Moscow–Brest Railway. Since 1870, there is a railway connection between Smolensk and Moscow. Local public transport includes buses and trolleybuses.
Public transportation network includes buses, trolleybuses, trams, and marshrutkas.

There are two airports located in the outskirts of the city; Smolensk South (civilian) and Smolensk North (military); however, there are no regular flights scheduled to Smolensk South Airport.

Education
Smolensk is home to the Smolensk State University (SMOLGU) and the Smolensk State Medical University (affiliated as university in 2015) (SSMU); together with colleges of further education and other educational institutes.

Twin towns – sister cities

Smolensk is twinned with:

 Colorado Springs, United States (1993- suspended 2022)
 Hagen, Germany (1985)
 Kerch, Ukraine (2000)
 Kragujevac, Serbia (2009)
 Targovishte, Bulgaria (2002)
 Tulle, France (1981)
 Vitebsk, Belarus

Notable people
Ivan Ivanovich Baryatinsky (1772-1825), Russian Rurikid Prince; father of Prince Aleksandr Baryatinsky. 
Yuri Gagarin (1934–1968), cosmonaut
Denis Maksimov (born 1988), philanthropist and industrialist
Timofey Mikhaylov (1859–1881), revolutionary, one of the assassins of Tsar Alexander II
Grigorii Maksimov (1893–1950), politician
Fyodor Glinka (1786–1880) a Russian poet and author.
Mikhail Glinka (1804 in Novospasskoye – 1857), composer.
Sergey Glinka (1774–1847) a minor Russian author of the Romantic period.
Anatoly Kharlampiyev (1906–1979), founder of Sambo
Eduard Khil (1934–2012), singer
Patriarch Kirill of Moscow (born 1946), religious leader
Sergey Konenkov (1874–1971), sculptor
Semyon Lavochkin (1900–1960), aircraft designer
Morris Markin (1893–1970), businessman and founder of Checker Motors Corporation
Viktor Nemytskii (1900–1967), mathematician
Grigory Potyomkin (1739 at Chizheva – 1791), statesman.
Andrey Starovoytov, (1915–1997), IIHF Hall of Fame inductee
Aleksandr Tvardovsky (1910–1971), writer

Honors
Smolensk Strait between Livingston Island and Deception Island in the South Shetland Islands, Antarctica is named after the city.

A Soviet post World War II project planned the creation of a light cruiser vessel named Smolensk. It was never constructed.

See also
Battle of Orsha
Immaculate Conception Church, Smolensk

References

Notes

Sources

 "Była notatka o opcjach prawnych śledztwa". Były dyplomata o katastrofie smoleńskiej - Polsat News, polsatnews.pl [dostęp 2020-03-18] (pol.)https://www.polsatnews.pl/wiadomosc/2016-10-24/byla-notatka-o-opcjach-prawnych-sledztwa-byly-dyplomata-o-katastrofie-smolenskiej/.

Bibliography

External links
 
 Official website of Smolensk
 Travel in Smolensk
 Smolensk news
 Smolensk Wiki
 Homepage of the Smolensk fortress
Some photos of the Smolensk fortress
More photos of Smolensk
(in English) Smolensk photos in Soviet times, 1983 in color
Historic images of Smolensk
 Basketball in Smolensk
 News of Smolensk sport
 News of Smolensk medicine
The murder of the Jews of Smolensk during World War II, at Yad Vashem website.
 
 Smolensk State Medical University

 
Forts in Russia
Portages
Smolensk Voivodeship
Smolensky Uyezd
Populated places on the Dnieper in Russia